Senator Haines may refer to:

C. William Haines (1928–1996), New Jersey State Senate
John Charles Haines (1818–1896), Illinois State Senate
Larry E. Haines (born 1938), Maryland State Senate
Phil Haines (born 1950), New Jersey State Senate